Grimm! Die wirklich Wahre Geschichte von Rotkäppchen und Ihrem Wolf (The True Story of Little Red Riding Hood and Her Wolf) is a German musical, with lyrics written by Peter Lund, music by Thomas Zaufke, and choreography by Neva Howard. The musical premiered on December 7, 2014, in Graz, Austria, at the Next Liberty Youth Theater.

The German premiere took place as a co-production with the Berlin University of the Arts at the Neuköllner Oper in Berlin, Germany, on March 19, 2015.

Synopsis 
Little Red Riding Hood is a 14-year-old girl who is tired of her nickname and wants to be called Dorothea. She lives in a village inhabited by various fairy-tale characters, including mother goat and her children, the three little pigs, the old farm dog and mayor, Sultan, and his son, Rex. Sultan has dark secrets he wants to remain hidden, while one of the pigs aspires to be mayor. 

The villagers are united in their fear of the forest and the wolves who lives within it. The wolves and the forest fascinate Little Red Riding Hood in spite of the stories. Eventually, her curiosity prevails and she goes into the woods, where she meets Grimm the wolf and discovers that he is not as frightening as his reputation suggests.

Little Red Riding Hood is drawn to the hermit wolf, and they become friends. The wolf has only ever known Pig Wild (a wild boar) and Granny Owl. Pig Wild believes that a wolf and human cannot be friends, in spite of her own taboo love. Granny Owl, however, supports the friendship of Grimm and Little Red Riding Hood. Moreover, she encourages her to bring him to the village to put an end to the rumors, unaware of the villagers' cruelty.

The villagers become defensive when Little Red Riding Hood brings Grimm to the village.

Productions 
Grimm! premiered at the Children's Theater of Opera Graz (Next Liberty) on 7 December 2014. The German premiere took place at the Neuköllner Oper in Berlin on March 19, 2015.

Cast

Ensemble in Graz  
December 7th 2014 to April 27th 2015

Cast 
 Director: Helge Stradner
 Conducted by Maurizio Nobili
 Accompanist: Saša Mutic
 Stage: Marlies Piper
 Costumes: Isabel Toccafondi
 Choreography: Benjamin Louis Rufin
 Image & Video: Bernd Ertl

Actors 
 Sigrid Spörk (Rotkäppchen)
 Christof Messner (Grimm, der junge Wolf)
 Franz Gollner (Sultan, der alte Hofhund)
 Florian Stanek (Rex, sein Sohn)
 János Mischuretz (Schweinchen Schlau)
 Eleftherios-Vinzenz Chladt (Schweinchen Doof / Schweinchen Wild)
 Alisca Baumann (Dicklinde, Schweinchen Dick)
 Jutta Panzenböck (Gisela Geiß / Großmutter Eule)

Musicians 
 Philipp Pluhar (drums / percussion)
 Maurizio Nobili (keyboards, percussion, conductor)
 Saša Mutic (piano, keyboards)
 Andriy Skorobogatko (piano, keyboards)
 Karl Rossmann (trumpet, flugelhorn, electric guitar)
 Gernot Strebl (saxophone, flute, clarinet)
 Reinhard Ziegerhofer (double bass, electric bass)

Ensemble in Berlin 
March 19th to April 14th 2015 with students of Universität der Künste, Berlin

Cast 
 Director: Peter Lund
 Conducted by Hans-Peter Kirchberg / Tobias Bartholmeß
 Choreography: Neva Howard
 Stage and Costumes: Ulrike Reinhard

Actors 
(in alphabetical order)
 Kiara Brunken (Schweinchen Wild)
 Devi-Ananda Dahm (Dorothea, Rotkäppchen)
 Sophia Euskirchen (Oma Eule)
 Fabian-Joubert Gallmeister (Schweinchen Schlau)
 Anthony Curtis Kirby (Rex)
 Dennis Hupka (Didi, (Schweinchen) Doof)
 Katharina Beatrice Hierl (Gisela Geiß)
 Jan-Philipp Rekeszus (Grimm)
 Dennis Weißert (Sultan, der alte Hofhund)
 Feline Zimmermann (Dicklinde, (Schweinchen) Dick)

Musicians 
 Piano: Hans-Peter Kirchberg / Tobias Bartholmeß
 Guitar: Jo Gehlmann / Hossein Yacery Manesh
 Trumpet, piccolo trumpet: Rainer Brennecke
 Reeds: Sidney Pfnür / Karola Elßner
 Synthesizer: Markus Meyer Mitter / Tobias Bartholmeß
 Drums: Stephan Genze
 Bass: Max Nauta

Songs 

Act 1
Prolog
Geh niemals in den Wald
So viele Wege
Sei ein wolf
Die Geschichte vom Alten Wolf
Die da im Dorf
Du bist nicht allein auf der Welt
Wie ein Märchen entsteht
Finale 1

Act 2
Die wirkliche wahre Geschichte vom alten Wolf
Leben mit Wolf
Die alte Geschichte
Der Wolf muss weg
Grimm
Du bist mein bester Freund
Der Schwein-Gehabt-Walzer
Didis Krise
Blut geleckt
Ein besseres Märchen
Und wenn sie nicht gestorben sind

Awards and nominations 
In August 2015, the performance in Graz was nominated in four categories for the German Musical Theatre Award by the German Musical Academy. On October 26, 2015 Peter Lund was awarded in the Best Book category, and Christof Messner won Best Actor.

Reviews 
"Lund and Zaufke have created an interesting new family musical which, despite some difficulties, works quite well. The score is wonderful, packed with some great moments, with all sorts of musical influences.“

See also 
Grimms' Fairy Tales

References

External links
 BZ Berlin und Youtube, Interview with some actors, movie by Jan Lindenau and Mareike Kürschner
 RBB Kulturradio,  Grimm - Das Musical an der Neuköllner Oper, Interview with Peter Lund, RBB Kulturradio, March 18, 2015

2014 musicals
German musicals
Plays based on fairy tales
Works based on Little Red Riding Hood